The Simonini 200cc is an Italian single cylinder, two-stroke, air-cooled aircraft engine, produced by Simonini Racing of San Dalmazio di Serramazzoni. The engine is used to power paramotors.

Applications
Fresh Breeze Simonini

Specifications (200cc)

References

Two-stroke aircraft piston engines
Air-cooled aircraft piston engines
Simonini aircraft engines